Price Peak is a peak in Antarctica located at the north side of Leverett Glacier, 8 nautical miles (15 km) north of the extremity of California Plateau. It was mapped by the United States Geological Survey (USGS) from ground surveys and U.S. Navy air photos from 1960 to 1963. It was named by Advisory Committee on Antarctic Names (US-ACAN) for Floyd W. Price, personnel-man with U.S. Navy Squadron VX-6, who participated in Operation Deep Freeze for 5 seasons, 1963–67.

Mountains of Marie Byrd Land